Arroyo Vista is an unincorporated community in El Dorado County, California. It lies at an elevation of 974 feet (297 m).

The community is made up of homesteads on five-acre lots north of Green Valley. The community maintains Arroyo Vista Way through an elected community services district. Arroyo Vista Way is a mile-long road containing 66 parcels. Landowners resisted incorporation by El Dorado Hills in 1998.

References

Unincorporated communities in California
Unincorporated communities in El Dorado County, California